The Zinda Jan District is located in the central part of Herat Province in Afghanistan.  It borders Gulran and Kushk districts to the north, Injil and Guzara districts to the east, Adraskan District to the south and Ghoryan and Kohsan districts to the west. The population is 55,500 (2012 year). The district center is the town of Zendeh Jan, situated in the valley of the Hari River.

Agriculture 
The following table demonstrates the total amount of irrigated and rain-fed lands in the district.

District map 
 Map of Settlements IMMAP, September 2011

References

Districts of Herat Province